Ryan Malaty (born September 6, 1989) is an American actor and television personality. Malaty stars on the Netflix feature film Reality High and the go90 series My Dead Ex. He is well known internationally for the MTV reality series Are You the One?, and has hosted the series AfterBuzz TV.

Filmography

References

External links

1989 births
Living people
21st-century American male actors
American male film actors
Male actors from New York City
Participants in American reality television series
People from Greeley, Colorado
University of Northern Colorado alumni